Gerson Henriques Gonçalves Lukeni (born 29 March 1996) is an Angolan basketball player. He plays for Atlético Petróleos de Luanda of the Angolan Basketball League.

Professional career
Gonçalves played for Petro de Luanda in the 2015 FIBA Africa Clubs Champions Cup.

He participated in the 2018–19 Africa Basketball League where he averaged 6.6 points, 2.8 rebounds and 3 assists per game.

Gonçalves was named the MVP of the Angolan League in 2019, after winning his second title with Petro. He repeated as most valuable player three years later, in 2022, after another national championship.

National team career
Gonçalves played for Angola's junior teams and helped them win the 2015 African Games. At the 2014 FIBA Africa Under-18 Championship, he averaged 16.6 points on his way to help Angola finish in 4th place.

represented the Angola national basketball team at the 2019 FIBA Basketball World Cup in China, where he averaged 3.2 points, 1 rebound and 1.5 assists per game.

BAL career statistics

|-
| style="text-align:left;"|2021
| style="text-align:left;"|Petro de Luanda
| 6 || 6 || 25.0 || .457 || .200 || .700 || 5.5 || 4.0 || 1.2 || .5 || 8.8
|-
|- class="sortbottom"
| style="text-align:center;" colspan="2"|Career
| 6 || 6 || 25.0 || .457 || .200 || .700 || 5.5 || 4.0 || 1.2 || .5 || 8.8

Awards and accomplishments

Club
3× Angolan League: (2019, 2021, 2022)
Taça de Angola: (2022)
Supertaça de Angola: (2021)

Individual
2× Angolan League MVP: (2019, 2022)
Angolan Basketball League Regular Season MVP: (2018)

References

External links
Gerson Goncalves at Eurobasket.com

1996 births
Living people
Atlético Petróleos de Luanda basketball players
People from Luanda
Angolan men's basketball players
Shooting guards